Marune: Alastor 933 (1975) is a science fiction novel by Jack Vance, the second of three books set in the Alastor Cluster, ‘a whorl of thirty thousand stars in an irregular volume twenty to thirty light-years in diameter’. Three thousand of the star systems are inhabited by five trillion humans, ruled by the mostly hands-off, laissez-faire Connatic, who occasionally, in the manner of Harun al-Rashid of The Thousand and One Nights, goes among his people in disguise. The novel was preceded by Trullion: Alastor 2262 (1973) and followed by Wyst: Alastor 1716 (1978).

Marune: Alastor 933 first appeared in serialized format in the July and September 1975 issues of Amazing Science Fiction magazine. It was issued in paperback book format on September 1975 by Ballantine Books.

Plot
A young man (provisionally called Pardero) has lost his memory—remembering almost nothing of his past. Acting on good advice, he earns enough money by menial labor to travel to the Connatic's free hospital on the capital planet Numenes. There, after much research, medical technicians are able to deduce from his reactions to various stimuli that he is a Rhune from the sparsely populated planet Marune—a planet illuminated by four stars (Suns). The Rhunes are a somewhat peculiar people who, among other traits, have a strong aversion to killing (unless it be in combat). From this and other clues, the man becomes convinced some enemy has caused his amnesia. He journeys home to find he is the ruler (Kaiark) of a small kingdom. He has to tread carefully, unsure of whom he can trust, in his quest to unmask his foe. Determined to unveil the identity of his enemy, who has erased his memory, he will clash with the strange customs of his people, based on the illumination provided by the four suns: in particular during the Mirk, when all the suns set in the sky and night falls, the men and women of Marune are left to strange behaviors. The novel ends abruptly.

References

External links
 

1975 American novels
1975 science fiction novels
1975 fantasy  novels
Novels by Jack Vance
American science fiction novels
Novels first published in serial form
Novels set on fictional planets
Works originally published in Amazing Stories
Fiction about amnesia